The 343d Bomb Squadron is a United States Air Force Reserve squadron, assigned to the 307th Operations Group.   It is stationed at Barksdale Air Force Base, Louisiana.

The squadron was first activated during World War II as the 343d Bombardment Squadron.  It saw combat in the Mediterranean Theater of Operations, participating in the low level attack on oil refineries near Ploiești, Romania.  It earned two Distinguished Unit Citations for its combat operations.  After VE Day the squadron returned to the United States and trained with Boeing B-29 Superfortresses until inactivating in spring 1946.

The squadron was reactivated in 1947 with Superfortresses.  During the Korean War, it deployed to Japan and earned another Distinguished Unit Citation for its combat operations.  The squadron returned to the United States and converted to the Boeing B-47 Stratojet, which it flew until inactivating in 1966 when the B-47 was withdrawn from service and Lincoln Air Force Base closed.

Overview
The squadron flies the B-52H Stratofortress.

History

World War II

Training in the United States

The squadron was first activated at MacDill Field, Florida as one of the original three squadrons assigned to the 98th Bombardment Group. The 343d soon moved to Barksdale Field, Louisiana, where it began to train as a Consolidated B-24 Liberator heavy bomber squadron under Third Air Force.

The squadron's training was short and it deployed to Egypt in July 1942 over the South Atlantic Ferrying Route transiting from Morrison Field, Florida though the Caribbean Sea to Brazil. It made the Atlantic crossing from Brazil to Liberia, then transited east across central Africa to Sudan.  The air echelon of the group reformed with the ground echelon which traveled by the SS Pasteur around the Cape of Good Hope, joining with the air echelon of the squadron, the 344th Bombardment Squadron and group headquarters at St Jean d'Acre Airfield, in Palestine.

Combat in the Middle East
Upon arrival in the Near East, the squadron became part of United States Army Middle East Air Force, which was replaced by Ninth Air Force in November.  It entered combat in August, attacking shipping and harbor installations to cut Axis supply lines to North Africa.  It also bombed airfields and rail transit lines in Sicily and mainland Italy.  The squadron moved forward with Ninth Air Force to airfields in Egypt; Libya and Tunisia supporting the British Eighth Army in the Western Desert Campaign.   Its support of this campaign earned the squadron the Distinguished Unit Citation.

On 1 August 1943, the squadron participated in Operation Tidal Wave, the low-level raid on oil refineries near Ploiești, Romania.  Alerted to the vulnerability of the Ploiești refineries by a June 1942 raid by the HALPRO project, the area around Ploiești had become one of the most heavily defended targets in Europe. The squadron pressed its attack on the Asta Romana Refinery through smoke and fire from bombing by another group's earlier attack and heavy flak defenses. The squadron's actions in this engagement earned it a second Distinguished Unit Citation.

343d Bomb Squadron's Colonel John R. Kane won the Medal of Honor for his heroic actions during the raid. The squadron lost half of its B-24s on the Ploiești Raid.

1st Lt. Donald D Pucket was posthumously award the Medal of Honor for trying to save the crew of his severely damaged B-24 Liberator bomber after an attack on the heavily defended oil refineries near Ploiești, Romania on 9 July 1944.

When the forces driving East from Egypt and Libya met up with those moving westward from Algeria and Morocco in Tunisia in September 1943, Ninth Air Force was transferred to England to become the tactical air force for the invasion of the European Continent. The squadron, along with all Army Air Forces units in North Africa became part of Twelfth Air Force.  In November 1943, the squadron moved to Brindisi Airport, Italy, where it became part of Fifteenth Air Force, which assumed control of strategic operations in the Mediterranean Theater of Operations, while Twelfth became a tactical air force.

Strategic operations in Italy
The squadron continued strategic bombardment raids on targets in Occupied France, southern Germany, Czechoslovakia, Hungary, Austria and targets in the Balkans.  These included industrial sites, airfields, harbors and lines of communication.  Although focusing on strategic bombing, the squadron was sometimes diverted to tactical operations, supporting Operation Shingle, the landings at Anzio and the Battle of Monte Cassino.  In the summer of 1944, the squadron supported Operation Dragoon, the invasion of southern France. The unit also assisted the Soviet advance into the Balkans, and supported Yugoslav Partisans and guerillas in neighboring countries.

Return to the United States
The squadron returned to the United States in May 1945.  Upon arrival it was redesignated as a very heavy Boeing B-29 Superfortress squadron and began training for deployment to the Pacific to conduct strategic bombardment raids on Japan.  In November 1945, the 98th Group was inactivated and the squadron moved to March Field, California, where it was assigned to the 40th Bombardment Group.  B-29 training continued until the unit was inactivated in March 1946.

Strategic Air Command

Reactivation

The squadron was reactivated in 1947 as a Strategic Air Command (SAC) Superfortress unit at Spokane Army Air Field, Washington.  The squadron performed strategic bombardment training missions until the outbreak of the Korean War.

Korean War

In the summer of 1950, when the Korean War began, the 19th Bombardment Wing was the only medium bomber unit available for combat in the Pacific.  In August, SAC dispatched the squadron and other elements of the 98th Bombardment Group to Yokota Air Base, Japan to augment FEAF Bomber Command, Provisional.  The group flew its first combat mission on 7 August against marshalling yards near Pyongyang, capital of North Korea. The squadron's missions focused on interdiction of enemy lines of communications, attacking rail lines, bridges and roads. The squadron also flew missions that supported United Nations ground forces.

SAC's mobilization for the Korean War highlighted that SAC wing commanders were not sufficiently focused on combat operations. Under a plan implemented for most wings in February 1951 and finalized in June 1952, the wing commander focused primarily on the combat units and the maintenance necessary to support combat aircraft by having the combat and maintenance squadrons report directly to the wing and eliminating the intermediate group structures. This reorganization was implemented in April 1951 for the 98th Wing, when wing headquarters moved on paper to Japan, taking over the personnel and functions of the 98th Group, which became a paper organization, and the squadron began operating under wing control.

Starting in January 1952, the threat posed by enemy interceptors forced the squadron to fly only night missions.  The unit flew its last mission, a propaganda leaflet drop, on the last day before the armistice was signed. The squadron remained in combat ready status in Japan until July 1954 when it moved to Lincoln Air Force Base, Nebraska.

Conversion to jet bombers

The squadron disposed of its B-29s to storage at Davis–Monthan Air Force Base, Arizona.  At Lincoln, the squadron was equipped with new Boeing B-47E Stratojets.   it engaged in strategic bombardment training with the B-47 throughout the rest of the 1950s, into the early 1960s.  From November 1955 through January 1966, the squadron deployed to RAF Lakenheath as part of Operation Reflex, standing alert at the forward deployment site.

From 1958, the 343d began to assume an alert posture at its home base, reducing the amount of time spent on alert at overseas bases to meet General Thomas S. Power's initial goal of maintaining one third of SAC's planes on fifteen minute ground alert, fully fueled and ready for combat to reduce vulnerability to a Soviet missile strike. The alert commitment was increased to half the squadron's aircraft in 1962.

Cuban Missile Crisis
Soon after detection of Soviet missiles in Cuba, on 22 October 1962 the squadron's B-47s dispersed. On 24 October the 343d went to DEFCON 2, placing all its aircraft on alert.  Most dispersal bases were civilian airfields with AF Reserve or Air National Guard units.  The unit's B-47s were configured for execution of the Emergency War Order as soon as possible after dispersing.  On 15 November 1/6 of the squadron's dispersed B-47s were recalled to Lincoln. The remaining B-47s and their supporting tankers were recalled on 24 November. On 27 November SAC returned its bomber units to normal alert posture.

The squadron was inactivated in June 1966 with the phaseout of the B-47 and closure of Lincoln.

Air Force Reserve
The squadron was reactivated at Barksdale Air Force Base, Louisiana as an Air Force Reserve Command B-52 Stratofortress squadron in January 2010. The 343rd continues to support the war against terrorism with aircrew and maintainers routinely deployed to support the B-52 mission at Al Udeid Air Base, Qatar for Operation Inherent Resolve and Operation Freedom's Sentinel.

On 19 April 2013, the 343rd Bomb Squadron participated in their first nuclear readiness exercise. The 343rd BS is the only nuclear certified squadron in the Air Force Reserve.

The 343rd Bomb Squadron received the Mitchell Trophy for most accurate munition drop during the Global Strike Challenge 2017. Global Strike Challenge is the world's premier Bomber, Intercontinental Ballistic Missile, Helicopter Operations and Security Forces competition with units from Air Force Global Strike Command, Air Combat Command, Air Force Reserve Command and the Air National Guard.

During Global Strike Challenge 2019, the 343rd Bomb Squadron consecutively earned the Mitchell Trophy for most accurate munitions drop.  Additionally, they were awarded with the Linebacker Trophy for best B-52 Squadron and the LeMay Trophy for Best Bomber Operations, celebrating the top performing unit within all of Air Force Global Strike Command.

Lineage
 Constituted 343d Bombardment Squadron (Heavy) on 28 January 1942
 Activated on 3 February 1942
 Redesignated 343d Bombardment Squadron, Heavy on 1 July 1943
 Redesignated 343d Bombardment Squadron, Very Heavy on 23 May 1945
 Inactivated on 27 March 1946
 Activated on 1 July 1947
 Redesignated 343d Bombardment Squadron, Medium on 28 May 1948
 Discontinued, and inactivated on 25 June 1966
 Redesignated as 343d Bomb Squadron on 9 March 2010
 Activated on 1 April 2010

Assignments
 98th Bombardment Group, 3 February 1942
 40th Bombardment Group, 10 November 1945 – 27 March 1946
 98th Bombardment Group, 1 July 1947 (attached to 98th Bombardment Wing after 1 April 1951)
 98th Bombardment Wing (later 98th Strategic Aerospace Wing), 16 June 1952 – 25 June 1966
 917th Operations Group, 1 April 2010
 307th Operations Group, 8 January 2011 – present

Stations

 MacDill Field, Florida, 3 February 1942
 Barksdale Field, Louisiana, 16 February 1942
 Page Field, Florida, 30 March 1942
 Drane Field, Florida, 15 May–3 July 1942
 RAF Ramat David, Palestine, 7 August 1942
 St Jean d'Acre Airfield, Palestine, 21 August 1942
 RAF Kabrit, Egypt, 10 November 1942
 RAF Gambut, Libya, 31 January 1943
 Lete Airfield, Libya, 3 March 1943
 Hergla Airfield, Tunisia, 25 September 1943
 Brindisi Airport, Italy, 18 November 1943
 Manduria Airfield, Italy, 19 December 1943
 Lecce Airfield, Italy, 17 January 1944 – 19 April 1945
 Fairmont Army Air Field, Nebraska, 8 May 1945
 McCook Army Air Field, Nebraska, 25 June 1945
 March Field, California, 10 November 1945 – 27 March 1946
 Andrews Field, Maryland, 1 July 1947
 Spokane Army Air Field (later Spokane Air Force Base, Fairchild Air Fore Base), Washington, 24 September 1947
 Yokota Air Base, Japan, 5 August 1950 – 22 July 1954
 Lincoln Air Force Base, Nebraska, 25 July 1954 – 25 June 1966 (deployed to RAF Lakenheath, England, 12 November 1955 – 28 January 1956)
 Barksdale Air Force Base, Louisiana, 1 April 2010 – present

Aircraft

 Consolidated B-24 Liberator, 1942–1945
 Boeing B-29 Superfortress, 1945; 1947–1954
 Boeing B-47 Stratojet, 1954–1966
 Boeing B-52 Stratofortress, 2010–present

See also

 B-24 Liberator units of the United States Army Air Forces
 List of B-29 Superfortress operators
 List of B-47 units of the United States Air Force
 List of United States Air Force squadrons

References
 Notes

Bibliography

 
 
 
 
 
 
 
 
 

Bombardment squadrons of the United States Air Force
Military units and formations in Louisiana
Military units and formations of the United States Air Force Reserves